Hans-Joachim Mann (born 26 June 1935) is a retired German Vizeadmiral and former Inspector of the Navy from 1986 until 1991.

References

External links

1935 births
Bundesmarine admirals
Vice admirals of the German Navy
Living people
Chiefs of Navy (Germany)
Commanders Crosses of the Order of Merit of the Federal Republic of Germany